Paolaura semistriata is a species of very small sea snail, a marine gastropod mollusk or micromollusk in the family Granulinidae. The species was first described by Smriglio and Mariottini in 2001.

References

Granulinidae
Gastropods described in 2001